Palaquium neoebudicum is a species of plant in the family Sapotaceae. It is endemic to Vanuatu.

References

neoebudicum
Vulnerable plants
Endemic flora of Vanuatu
Taxonomy articles created by Polbot